Aqai may refer to:
Açaí palm, a tree
Aqai, Azna, Lorestan Province, Iran
Aqai, Borujerd, Lorestan Province, Iran